The artistic roller skating events at the 2001 World Games in Akita was played between 22 and 23 August. 27 roller skaters, from 10 nations, participated in the tournament. The artistic roller skating competition took place at Akita Prefectural Skating Rink.

Participating nations

Medal table

Events

References

External links
 World Skate
 Roller sports on IWGA website
 Results

 
2001 World Games
2001